Chandrabhaga Dam, is an earthfill dam on Chandrabhaga river near Amravati in state of Maharashtra in India.

Specifications

Purpose
 Irrigation
 Hydroelectricity
 Water supply

See also
 Dams in Maharashtra
 List of reservoirs and dams in India

References

Earth-filled dams
Dams in Amravati district
Year of establishment missing